Långsjön, Tyresta is a lake in Stockholm County, Södermanland, Sweden. It is located in Tyresta National Park.

References

Lakes of Stockholm County